Nadia Soledad Báez (born 26 June 1989) is a blind Argentine Paralympic swimmer who competes in international level events. She competed at the 2012 Summer Paralympics, winning  a bronze medal. She competed at the 2020 Summer Paralympics.

Career
She competed at the 2007 Parapan American Games,  2011 Parapan American Games , 2010 IPC Swimming World Championships, where she won a silver medal. 2015 Parapan American Games, and 2019 Parapan American Games, where she won two gold and two bronze medals.

References

1989 births
Living people
Swimmers from Buenos Aires
Paralympic swimmers of Argentina
Swimmers at the 2008 Summer Paralympics
Swimmers at the 2012 Summer Paralympics
Swimmers at the 2016 Summer Paralympics
Medalists at the 2012 Summer Paralympics
Medalists at the World Para Swimming Championships
Paralympic medalists in swimming
Paralympic bronze medalists for Argentina
Medalists at the 2019 Parapan American Games
Argentine female breaststroke swimmers
S11-classified Paralympic swimmers
21st-century Argentine women